Bauyrzhan Yerbosynuly Islamkhan (Bauyrjan Erbosynūly İslamhan; born 23 February 1993) is a Kazakh professional footballer who plays as an attacking midfielder for Kazakhstan Premier League club Ordabasy and the Kazakhstan national team. In the past he served as a captain for the Kazakhstan under-21 team. He is also a 6-time vice-champion of Kazakhstan and 4-time winner of the country cup.

Club career

Taraz 
Islamkhan came up through Taraz's youth academy and impressed from an early age. He made his first team debut on 6 March 2011 in the Kazakhstan Premier League match against Irtysh, at the age of 18, and since then was a member of the Taraz's first-team squad. Next season he became the captain of the club when he was just 19 years old. He also scored six goals during his stay in Taraz. In 2012 season in the Premier League, Islamkhan recorded 22 appearances and scored 4 goals. Islamkhan has earned the Kazakhstan Football Federation's Young Player of the Year award as voted on by the coaches for his performances in his campaign for Taraz during the 2012 season.

Kuban Krasnodar 
On his birthday in 2013, he signed a three-year deal with Kuban Krasnodar. He made his debut on 25 February 2013 in a friendly game against Torpedo Armavir. However, he did not play for them in the Russian Premier League and stayed there a half-year playing for their second team.

Loan to Astana 
On 6 June 2013, he joined Astana on a season-long loan deal. During his playing for Astana, he appeared in seven matches and scored one goal. On 4 July 2013, he made his debut in the UEFA Europa League, coming on as a substitute in the 62nd minute in a first qualifying round match against Botev Plovdiv.

Kairat 
On 11 February 2014, a transfer deal was made between the teams FC Kuban Krasnodar and FC Kairat after that he signed a three-year deal with Kairat. In the end of July, 2016 he got an offer from the champions and the leading team of Kazakhstan Premier League at that moment, FC Astana, to join the team when the contract with FC Kairat expires. However, it was rejected by the footballer. Islamkhan left Kairat at the end of the 2019 season after his contract expired. Following his release from Kairat, Islamkhan joined Zenit St.Petersburg on trial during their January training camp in Qatar.

Al Ain 
On 31 January 2020, he signed for UAE side Al Ain until the end of 2019–20 season.

In December 2020, Islamkhan was handed a two-year ban from football after testing positive for a banned substance after an Al Ain game in the AFC Champions League during September 2020.

International career 

Islamkhan made his international debut for Kazakhstan in a friendly game against Latvia on 29 February 2012. During 2014 FIFA World Cup qualification tournament, Islamkhan played two times coming on as a substitute in matches against Sweden and Austria.

In November 2022, after completing a two-year suspension, Bauyrzhan Islamkhan received a call-up to the Kazakhstan national team for friendly matches against Uzbekistan and the UAE.

Career statistics

Club

International

Honours
Kairat
 Kazakhstan Cup: 2014, 2015

Individual
 Kazakh Footballer of the Year: 2014

References

External links

 
 
 
 
 

Living people
1993 births
Kazakhstani footballers
Kazakhstan international footballers
Kazakhstan under-21 international footballers
Kazakhstan Premier League players
UAE Pro League players
FC Astana players
FC Kairat players
FC Kuban Krasnodar players
FC Taraz players
Al Ain FC players
People from Taraz
Association football midfielders
Expatriate footballers in Russia
Expatriate footballers in the United Arab Emirates
Kazakhstani expatriate sportspeople in Russia
Doping cases in association football